Kenneth Gregory Steenstra (born October 13, 1970) is an American former professional baseball pitcher and current coach. He played in Major League Baseball (MLB) for the Chicago Cubs. He attended Wichita State University.

High school
Kennie attended Plato High School, in south central Missouri. Steenstra broke the record for being the winningest high school pitcher with 65 victories.

Draft
Steenstra was selected in the 12th round, 331st overall by the Cubs in the 1992 MLB draft.

Minor leagues
Steenstra was used almost entirely as a starter in his pre-major league pro career. In fact, he was used as a reliever only four times. In 1992, with the Geneva Cubs and Peoria Chiefs, he went a combined 9-3 with a 1.89 earned run average. In  he went 14-6, and in 1994 he went 9-7 with a 2.61 ERA for the Orlando Cubs.

Major leagues
On May 21,  at the age of 27, Steenstra made his MLB debut wearing number 49 for the Cubs. In one inning against the Los Angeles Dodgers, he gave up one hit, one walk, struck out one and surrendered no runs. Overall, he finished with a 10.80 ERA in 3⅓ innings, striking out four, but giving up two home runs (the first to Javy López and the second to Magglio Ordóñez). In total, he gave up seven hits and allowed two runners to steal against him. He played his final game on June 7. During the 1998 season, Steenstra earned $170,000.

After the majors
After his brief stint in the majors, Steenstra bounced around in the minors until  in the Atlanta Braves, Seattle Mariners, Arizona Diamondbacks, St. Louis Cardinals, Baltimore Orioles and Florida Marlins organizations.

In between, he played winter ball with the Águilas del Zulia and Leones del Caracas clubs of the Venezuelan League during two seasons spanning 1995–1998.

Following his playing days, he has worked as a pitching coach for the Lincoln Saltdogs (2004), Delmarva Shorebirds (2005–2006) and Frederick Keys (2014).

Steenstra was hired to be the pitching coach for the Bowie Baysox, the Double-A affiliate of the Baltimore Orioles, for the 2018 season. He was promoted to pitching coach of the Triple-A Norfolk Tides prior to the 2020 season. On October 4, 2021, the Orioles dismissed Steenstra from his position.

References

External links
, or Retrosheet, or The Baseball Gauge, or Venezuelan Professional Baseball League

1970 births
Living people
Águilas del Zulia players
All-American college baseball players
American expatriate baseball players in Canada
American people of Dutch descent
Baseball coaches from Missouri
Baseball players at the 1991 Pan American Games
Baseball players from Missouri
Calgary Cannons players
Chicago Cubs players
Daytona Cubs players
Geneva Cubs players
Greenville Braves players
Iowa Cubs players
Leones del Caracas players
American expatriate baseball players in Venezuela
Major League Baseball pitchers
Memphis Redbirds players
Minor league baseball coaches
Orlando Cubs players
Pan American Games bronze medalists for the United States
Pan American Games medalists in baseball
Peoria Chiefs players
Rochester Red Wings players
Sportspeople from Springfield, Missouri
Tacoma Rainiers players
Tucson Sidewinders players
Wichita State Shockers baseball players
Medalists at the 1991 Pan American Games